The 2018–19 season will be the 56th season of competitive association football in Algeria. The national team became African champions for the second time, by winning the 2019 Africa Cup of Nations helds in Egypt.

Competitions

Promotion and relegation

Pre-season

National teams

Algeria national football team

Kits

2019 Africa Cup of Nations qualification

International Friendlies

2019 Africa Cup of Nations

League season

Ligue Professionnelle 1

Ligue Professionnelle 2

Women's football

References